David Bullock may refer to:
 David Bullock (entrepreneur) (born June 15, 1993), an American technology entrepreneur and media executive known professionally as "Alaska".
 David Bullock Harris (1814–1864), a colonel in the Confederate States Army
 David Bullock (serial killer) (born November 13, 1960), an American serial killer also known as the "The .38 Caliber Killer".